The Trinidad to Clam Beach Run began in the 60s in Humboldt County, CA as an 8.75 mile winter training race for track and field athletes attending Humboldt State University. The event grew into a nationally known run and added a 3 mile and 5 ¾ mile race. A half marathon was added in 2002, but has since been discontinued, until 2017 when the half marathon a been resumed.

The Run starts 3 miles north of Trinidad, California on Patrick's Point Drive. It continues through town, down Scenic Drive to Moonstone Beach and then on to Clam Beach. Crossing the mouth of the Little River at Moonstone Beach is a dramatic feature of the course. The height of the tide on either the last Saturday of January or the first Saturday of February determines the Run's date and start time. The final leg is on Clam Beach.

The Trinidad to Clam Beach Run is sponsored by the Greater Trinidad Chamber of Commerce. Profits from the Run support the Chamber’s scholarship fund.

In 2014 the race was on Saturday, January 25.

External links 
Trinidad to Clam Beach Run
Greater Trinidad Chamber of Commerce

References
 Clam Beach Run a Big Hit (2008-02-02) Eureka Reporter. Accessed: 2008-10-26. (Archived by WebCite at https://www.webcitation.org/5brt18JYQ)

Tourist attractions in Humboldt County, California
Foot races in California
1960s establishments in California
Cal Poly Humboldt Lumberjacks
Recurring sporting events established in the 1960s